Videomation is a North America-exclusive art application for the Nintendo Entertainment System that was released in 1991.

In mid-1994, Polish company BobMark Int., that distributed Pegasus in the region, got rights from Western Technologies to distribute this game in Asian cartridge.

Overview

This application allows players to create artwork using a mostly freestyle method, with support for full video animation. The game does not support the use of a mouse or any other external component, requiring users to rely on the NES game controller to draw objects. There is a basic grey screen surrounded by graphics stamps. This application utilizes the CHR RAM chip that is also used in a variety of other contemporaneous NES video games. Thirteen different variations of palettes and seven different kinds of tools (including a pen, various geometric shapes,and the eraser) are available for use in creative compositions. Once the user chooses one of the palettes, there are different colors to choose. The colors include these: turquoise, pink, purple, light blue, and colors that have been dithered.

After drawing a stationary picture, the game allows to place one of a few possible animatable objects (these include a man, a child, a car, a plane, etc.) and then choose a path it will follow on the screen. One options allows the object to follow the cursor.

The game's instruction manual has some ideas for drawing including these: geometric designs with intense patches of color, birds flying over untamed jungles, cars on a race track, and dinosaurs in the user's imaginary backyard.

There is no data storage or export medium, so pictures and video can only be saved by recording a playback of the NES's display through a VCR.

Reception
According to InstallSoftware.com, the game offers a relatively good short-term replay factor while lacking on the long-term replay factor.

See  also

 Mario Paint
 Mario Artist

References

1991 video games
Nintendo Entertainment System games
Nintendo Entertainment System-only games
North America-exclusive video games
THQ games
Video games developed in the United States